West Fifth Street Bridge may refer to:
 Ashtabula lift bridge, a bridge over the Ashtabula River in Ashtabula, Ohio
 West Fifth Street Bridge at Shoal Creek, a bridge in downtown Austin, Texas